Stamata is a community in East Attica, Greece. Since the 2011 local government reform, it is part of the municipality Dionysos, of which it is a municipal unit. The municipal unit has an area of 18.950 km2.

Stamata is a rather exclusive suburb, situated between the Parnitha and Penteli mountains, about 23 km northeast of Athens. Till the last decades, only the main village was inhabited, while the rural area was cultivated by the inhabitants of the village. Nowadays, there are also residences in the settlement of Amygdaleza (Αμυγδαλέζα) and the residential associations of Euxeinos Pontos (Εύξεινος Πόντος) and Prokonisos (Προκόνησος). Stamata could be designated as a rural, rather than a suburban, area, but luxury houses and villas are continuously being developed, mainly in the aforementioned residential associations, turning Stamata into an upper middle class suburb.

Land use

A beautiful pine forest covers the largest part of Stamata, where any kind of development is strictly prohibited by law, although it is an open secret that there are various cases of trespassing and environmental devastation. The residential areas cover only a small part, while in the remaining rural areas, there are sheepcotes, farmlands and vineyards.

Legend

Stamata is believed to lie along the route run by Pheidippides on his mythical journey to declare victory in the Battle of Marathon, which gave its name to the marathon sporting event. According to the legend, Pheidippides was urged to stop while passing through the community, hence giving it its name.

Cuisine

Stamata is now famed for its tavernas serving grilled meat, popular among weekending Athenians, and the viticulture.

See also
List of municipalities of Attica

References

Dionysos, Greece
Populated places in East Attica